Kalecik Dam may refer to:

 Kalecik Dam (Elazığ)
 Kalecik Dam (Osmaniye)